Abdolabad is a village in Tankaman Rural District, Tankaman District, Nazarabad County, Alborz Province, Iran. At the 2006 census, its population was 126, in 31 families.

References 

Populated places in Nazarabad County